Zanthoxylum harrisii is a species of plant in the family Rutaceae. It is endemic to Jamaica.  It is threatened by habitat loss.

References

Flora of Jamaica
harrisii
Vulnerable plants
Endemic flora of Jamaica
Taxonomy articles created by Polbot